Aphelochaeta striata is a species of bitentaculate cirratulidan first found in the Pacific coast of Costa Rica, at a shallow subtidal depth of about  in the Gulf of Nicoya. It is characterised by possessing a narrow body and transverse blue stripes across the venter of its setigers 5 through 8 (visible via methyl green staining).

References

External links
WORMS

Terebellida